The 1940 Giro d'Italia was the 28th edition of the Giro d'Italia, organized and sponsored by the newspaper La Gazzetta dello Sport.

The race was won by Fausto Coppi (at his first participation) of the Legnano team, with fellow Italians Enrico Mollo and Giordano Cottur coming in second and third respectively.

Coppi, who was 20 years old at the time, is the youngest winner of the Giro.

Participants
Of the 91 riders that began the Giro d'Italia on 17 May 1940, 47 of them made it to the finish in Milan on 9 June May. Riders were allowed to ride as a member of a team or group; 41 riders competed as part of a team, while the remaining 50 competed as a part of a group. The eight teams that partook in the race were: Bianchi, Legnano, Gloria, Olympia, Lygie, Gerbi. Each team started with either six or seven riders. The Ganna team did not start the race due to the team's Belgian riders not being cleared to enter the country. There were also seven groups, made up of three to five riders each, that participated in the race. Those groups were: S. C. Binda, G. S. Battisti-Aquilano, U. S. Azzini-Universal, Cicli Viscontea, Dopolavoro Az. Bemberg, U. C. Modenese, Il Littoriale, Dopolavoro Az. Vismara, S. S. Parioli, and G. S. Mater.

The peloton was composed primarily of Italian riders. The field featured two former Giro d'Italia winners with two-time winners Gino Bartali and Giovanni Valetti, who was the reigning champion. Bartali studied the route for the Giro intensely during the winter before the race and during reconnaissance rides, he befriended local business owners with the hopes of contacting for local road and weather conditions during the race. Other notable Italian riders included Olimpio Bizzi, Ezio Cecchi, and Fausto Coppi. The only non-Italian riders to compete in the race were Luxembourgian Christophe Didier and Swiss rider Walter Diggelmann. Bartali and Valetti were both seen a strong contenders for the overall title.

Route and stages

Race overview

During the second stage, Bartali crashed into a dog that ran onto the road, throwing him from the bike. He returned to his bike, but a doctor examination after finishing the stage, led the diagnosis of a strained muscle and a recommendation to withdraw from the race. Bartali elected to remain the race, but knew he could not win.

Classification leadership
The leader of the general classification – calculated by adding the stage finish times of each rider – wore a pink jersey. This classification is the most important of the race, and its winner is considered as the winner of the Giro.

In the mountains classification, the race organizers selected different mountains that the route crossed and awarded points to the riders who crossed them first.

The winner of the team classification was determined by adding the finish times of the best three cyclists per team together and the team with the lowest total time was the winner. If a team had fewer than three riders finish, they were not eligible for the classification. The group classification was decided in the same manner, but the classification was exclusive to the competing groups.

The rows in the following table correspond to the jerseys awarded after that stage was run.

Final standings

General classification

Group rider classification

Mountains classification

Team classification

Group classification

Giovanni De Stefanis won the special category prize which was the best ranked group rider in the general classification.

References

Footnotes

Citations

Bibliography

1940
Giro d'Italia
Giro d'Italia
Giro d'Italia
Giro d'Italia